NGC 1273 is a lenticular galaxy located about 245 million light-years away in the constellation Perseus. It was discovered by astronomer Heinrich d'Arrest on February 14, 1863 and is a member of the Perseus Cluster.

See also
 List of NGC objects (1001–2000)

References

External links
 

Perseus Cluster
Perseus (constellation)
Lenticular galaxies
1273
12396
Astronomical objects discovered in 1863